Dynamite is a steel roller coaster at Freizeitpark Plohn, located in Lengenfeld, Saxony, Germany, manufactured by Mack Rides from the type BigDipper. The roller coaster opened on May 18, 2019 and is the second roller coaster of the manufacturer's BigDipper model after Lost Gravity in Walibi Holland. Dynamite was built on the site of the former Silver Mine. According to the park, dynamite was the park's largest single investment when it opened.

Ride experience 

After the train has left the station, it drives onto the lift hill, which ends in a dive drop at the top. There follows a right turn with 360 °, at the end of which is the looping. After the loop, the train goes into zero-g-roll before it returns to the station after a 180 ° left turn and a travel time of just over a minute.

Trains 

Dynamite has two individual trains with space for eight people each (two rows of four people).

References

External links 
 Homepage
 

Steel roller coasters
Roller coasters
Roller coasters in Germany
Roller coasters introduced in 2019
Roller coasters manufactured by Mack Rides